{{Speciesbox
| image = 
| genus = Ophichthus
| species = macrochir
| authority = (Bleeker, 1853) 
| synonyms_ref = <ref>[http://www.fishbase.org/Nomenclature/SynonymsList.php?ID=59840&SynCode=52372&GenusName=Ophichthus&SpeciesName=macrochir Synonyms of Ophichthus macrochir] at www.fishbase.org.</ref>
| synonyms = 
 Ophisurus macrochir Bleeker, 1853
 Centrurophis macrochir (Bleeker, 1853)
}}

The bigfin snake eel (Ophichthus macrochir'') is an eel in the family Ophichthidae (worm/snake eels). It was described by Pieter Bleeker in 1853. It is a tropical, marine eel which is known from the Indo-Pacific. It dwells at a depth range of 0–25 metres, and inhabits sand and mud. Males can reach a maximum total length of 92 centimetres.

References

Ophichthus
Taxa named by Pieter Bleeker
Fish described in 1853